Jason Perillo (born August 20, 1977) is an American politician who has served in the Connecticut House of Representatives from the 113th district since 2007.

References

1977 births
Living people
People from Shelton, Connecticut
21st-century American politicians
Republican Party members of the Connecticut House of Representatives
Georgetown University alumni
Carroll School of Management alumni
Harvard Kennedy School alumni